Acqui Terme railway station serves the town and comune of Acqui Terme, in the Piedmont region, northwestern Italy.

Railway stations in Piedmont
Railway stations opened in 1858
Acqui Terme